Phestilla is a genus of sea slugs, aeolid nudibranchs, marine gastropod molluscs in the family Trinchesiidae. 

Its members are unusual in feeding on hard corals, unlike other members of the family Trinchesiidae which feed on hydroids. Adult Phestilla have no cnidosacs. This genus has been investigated using DNA phylogeny and undescribed species exist.

Species
Species within the genus Phestilla include:
 Phestilla chaetopterana (Ekimova, Deart & Schepetov, 2017)
 Phestilla fuscostriata Hu, Zhang, Xie & Qiu, 2020
 Phestilla goniophaga Hu, Zhang, Yiu, Xie & Qui, 2020
 Phestilla lugubris (Bergh, 1870)
 Phestilla melanobrachia Bergh, 1874
 Phestilla minor Rudman, 1981
 Phestilla panamica Rudman, 1982
 Phestilla poritophages (Rudman, 1979)
 Phestilla sibogae Bergh, 1905
 Phestilla subodiosa A. Wang, Conti-Jerpe, J. L. Richards & D. M. Baker, 2020
 Phestilla viei Mehrotra, Caballer & Chavanich in Mehrotra, Arnold, Wang, Chavanich, Hoeksema & Caballer, 2020

Species names currently considered to be synonyms:
 Phestilla hakunamatata Ortea, Caballer & Espinosa, 2003 synonym of Hermosita hakunamatata (Ortea, Caballer & Espinosa, 2003)
 Phestilla subodiosus A. Wang, Conti-Jerpe, J. L. Richards & D. M. Baker, 2020 : synonym of Phestilla subodiosa A. Wang, Conti-Jerpe, J. L. Richards & D. M. Baker, 2020 (incorrect gender agreement of specific epithet)

References

External links 
 Nudipixel page for the genus
 Bergh, L. S. R. (1874). Neue Nacktschnecken der Südsee, malacologische Untersuchungen II. Journal des Museum Godeffroy. 2(6): 91-116
 Bieler, R. & R. E. Petit, 2012. Molluscan taxa in the publications of the Museum Godeffroy of Hamburg, with a discussion of the Godeffroy Sales Catalogs (1864–1884), the Journal des Museum Godeffroy (1873–1910), and a history of the museum. Zootaxa, 3511: 1-80
 Cella, K; Carmona Barnosi, L.; Ekimova, I; Chichvarkhin, A; Schepetov, D; Gosliner, T. M. (2016). A radical solution: The phylogeny of the nudibranch family Fionidae. PLoS ONE. 11(12): e0167800
 Korshunova, T.; Martynov, A.; Picton, B. (2017). Ontogeny as an important part of integrative taxonomy in tergipedid aeolidaceans (Gastropoda: Nudibranchia) with a description of a new genus and species from the Barents Sea. Zootaxa. 4324(1): 1

Trinchesiidae